Driss ben Hamed Charhadi (1937–1986) is the alias for Larbi Layachi, a Moroccan story-teller, some of whose stories have been translated by Paul Bowles from Moroccan Arabic to English. His book, A Life Full of Holes was tape-recorded and translated by Bowles over the course of several visits to his home by Charhadi, and published in 1964 by Grove Press
A second collection of stories, Yesterday and Today, was published by Black Sparrow Press in 1985.

References

External links 
Driss ben Hamed Charhadi and Paul Bowles: A Life Full of Holes at Qantara.de
Larbi Layachi: Yesterday and Today at Godine.com

Moroccan storytellers
Moroccan novelists
Moroccan writers
1937 births
1986 deaths